The Bay of Pigs Museum, also known as the Brigade 2506 Museum and Library, is the official museum in memory of the Bay of Pigs Invasion's Brigade 2506 in Little Havana, Miami, Florida.

History
In September 1987, Arnhilda Gonzalez-Quevedo, the Republican member of the Florida House of Representatives for Coral Gables, presented the museum founders with $75,000 from the state of Florida for its construction. The museum was dedicated on April 17, 1988, at 1821 South West Ninth Street in Little Havana, Miami by 400 attendees, including veterans and Cuban exiles.

In 2015, Frank de Varona, a veteran and author, attempted to nominate the building for historic registration, only to withdraw the nomination due to opposition from other veterans.

Collections
According to Time Out Miami, the museum has "a small but interesting collection of ephemera and memorabilia" about the Bay of Pigs Invasion, including the Brigade 2506 flag held by Democratic President John F. Kennedy in his 1962 address.

Political visits
The museum was visited by Republican presidential candidate Fred Thompson in December 2007. In October 2016, Republican presidential candidate Donald Trump visited the museum. The museum was also visited by Republican gubernatorial candidate Ron DeSantis in September 2018. As governor, DeSantis again visited the museum on February 8, 2021, to introduce the COVID-19 vaccination program for veterans.

See also
Bay of Pigs Monument

References

External links

Bay of Pigs Museum, MuseumsUSA
 Bay of Pigs Museum, TimeOut Miami

1988 establishments in Florida
Cuba–United States military relations
Museums established in 1988
Museums in Miami